Winnington is an area of Northwich, Cheshire, England.

Winnington may also refer to:
Winnington, Shropshire, England, birthplace of Old Tom Parr (1482/1483–1635)
Winnington baronets
John Winnington
Thomas Winnington (disambiguation)
Francis Winnington (disambiguation)
Edward Winnington (disambiguation)

See also